The Central Maryland Corsairs Squadron is a unit of the United States Naval Sea Cadet Corps (USNSCC) located at Naval Air Facility Washington, Maryland on Joint Base Andrews, Maryland.

History
On 1 October 1987, the Central Maryland Division of the USNSCC was formed in Bethesda, Maryland.  Then, in 1994 the division moved to Naval Air Facility Washington on Andrews AFB and became the Central Maryland Corsairs Squadron.  After September 11, the Squadron lost its home base like many other USNSCC units and had to drill temporarily at American Legion Post 259 in Clinton, Maryland for several months before returning to NAFW in January 2002. This Squadron is a mixed unit that supports NSCC and NLCC cadets in an equal training fashion. NLCC cadets may hold billets higher than those of NSCC cadets but they are technically still a lower rank and must render appropriate behaviors towards and under NSCC cadets of equal or higher rate.

Divisions

Sundowners
Sundowners is the Indoc unit of the squadron, and thus focuses on teaching new cadets drill, military bearing, Navy standards, NSCC standards, uniform standards, and basic military history. This is also the only unit that is currently active that supports both NLCC and NSCC cadets.  Sundowners are also expected to complete an exit exam with questions pulled from the information that they learned in class from at least four drill weekends prior (the classes cycle in order and repeat every four weeks).  Also in most cases, sundowners must complete and pass a PRT (physical readiness test) and complete their first correspondence course which is the LC-2 course for NLCC cadets and the BMR (Basic Military Requirements; 15 assignments from 22 chapters of the Navy Bluejackets Manual) for NSCC cadets. League cadets move onto the Ghost Riders division after advancement while Sea Cadets enter the Black Aces division.

Ghost Riders
Ghost Riders Division is for League Cadets after their advancement out of Sundowners.  They are expected to still complete at least 1 correspondence course per year (they are encouraged to complete as many as possible so that training and time are the only factors restraining promotion), attend 75% of drill weekends, promote the squadron, assist Sundowners as needed, and maintain all of the standards and practices learned in Sundowners.  Ghost Riders are treated as equals to Black Aces in relation to squadron organized trainings and local advanced trainings. All Ghost Riders are much more limited as far as summer trainings go with about 1/5 of the options as Black Aces due to the NLCC having a much more limited budget and significantly less members as the NSCC. Also, Ghost Riders are much less likely to be selected to attend specialized leadership trainings for selected personnel based on the fact that even LPO's are often in charge of small numbers of cadets due to low volume.

Black Aces
The Black Aces Division is for Sea Cadets after their advancement through Sundowners.  Black Aces must follow the same guidelines as Ghost Riders to stay in the unit and the division.  They are usually expected to help out their shipmates more than Ghost Riders because of their older age and generally higher standards.  All Sea Cadets must attend a Recruit Training (Boot Camp) before attending any other advanced trainings

References

1994 establishments in Maryland